A food festival is a festival, that uses food, often produce, as its central theme. These festivals have always been a means of uniting communities through celebrations of harvests and giving thanks for a plentiful growing season.

History 
Food Festivals throughout the world are often based on traditional farming techniques, seasons Food festivals are related to food culture of an area, whether through the preparation of food served or the time period in which the festival is celebrated. Food festivals are considered strengthening agents for local cultural heritage, and simultaneously celebrate this cultural heritage while also commodifying it for a killer

national or international audience. While historically aligned with culturally significant food harvesting periods, contemporary food festivals are usually associated with businesses entities or nonprofit organizations and engage a great deal of marketing for their festivals, since their success is measured off how much revenue they generate for the local community, region, or entity putting on the event. Modern food festivals are also a large part of the food tourism industry, which uses food festivals and regional cuisine to support the broader tourism industry of a particular locality.

Food Tourism 
Food festivals are quickly becoming part of a vast food tourism industry. Food tourism itself has become an important part of the tourism industry worldwide, and the presence of food festivals shown to support local industry development. Food festivals are an important part of destination branding for many regions, creating an event-based reason for individuals to visit otherwise unattractive localities and promote local products and services outside of an urban product environment. Several case studies have shown that food festivals can potentially improve social sustainability while also heavily supporting the tourism and hospitality industries. Food tourism is also an important reason why people attend food festivals around the world. Studies have shown that engagement with food tourism indicates that an individual will attend festivals again in the future, indicating a cooperative element to food tourism and food festival attendance.

List of food and drink festivals

Africa

Oceania

North America

Canada

See List of food festivals in Canada.

Mexico

 Puerto Vallarta festival

United States

There are several Florida food festivals and New Jersey food festivals. Other festivals include 626 Night Market in Arcadia, California; Gilroy Garlic Festival in Gilroy, California; Brentwood Cornfest in Brentwood, California; Mushroom Festivals in various locales; the Castroville Artichoke Festival, in Castroville, California; the Stockton Asparagus Festival, in Stockton, California; the ¡Latin Food Festival! in San Diego, California; the Lexington Barbecue Festival in North Carolina; the Posen Potato Festival, in Posen, Michigan; the Norwalk Oyster Festival, in Norwalk, Connecticut, Vaisakhi Festival in Yuba City, California, and the Howell Melon Festival in Howell, Michigan, known for electing the Howell Melon Queen.

Vegetarian food festivals include VegFests in Boston, Massachusetts; Salt Lake City, Utah;  and San Francisco, California; Seattle, Washington; including the premier Boston Vegetarian Food Festival in autumn, an event originally copied from the then already longstanding Toronto Vegetarian Food Fair in Toronto, Ontario. The List of vegetarian festivals includes hundreds of such events in North America, and hundreds elsewhere, also.

Asia

South America

Europe

Italy
Asti's Festival of Festivals held in Asti in September.
Battle of the Oranges is a traditional orange fight held in Ivrea each February.
 Cibus

Spain
 La Tomatina - a tomato-throwing festival held in late August in Buñol.
 L’Aplec del Caragol - a snail-eating festival held in Lleida in May.

Switzerland

 The Räbechilbi turnip festival is held annually in September.
 A cheese festival is held in Gruyére in May.

United Kingdom

See also
 List of dining events

References

External links

Food and drink festivals